Admiral Sir Anthony Monckton Synnot,  (5 January 1922 – 4 July 2001) was a senior officer in the Royal Australian Navy, who served as Chief of the Defence Force Staff from 1979 to 1982.

Early life
Synnot was born in 1922 at Corowa, New South Wales, a descendant of Monckton Synnot, brother of Captain Timothy Monckton Synnot and a distant relative of the American Saint Elizabeth Ann Seton. Synnot was educated at Geelong Grammar School. He joined the Royal Australian Navy as a cadet midshipman in March 1939 and trained in Britain with Prince Philip of Greece (as he then was). His first ship was the cruiser HMAS Canberra.

Naval career
During the Second World War, Synnot served aboard the destroyer  in the Battle of Cape Matapan, for which he was mentioned in despatches, and during the evacuation of Greece and Crete. With the Royal Navy, he saw service on the battleship  and was on board the destroyer  when she sank off Iceland in 1942 after being accidentally rammed by the battleship .

Subsequently, Synnot served for two years on the Australian destroyer  on North Sea convoy duty and during the North Africa landings, eventually becoming the ship's executive officer. In 1945, Synnot qualified as a gunnery officer and  served on the staff of gunnery schools in Australia. He became captain of the Daring-class destroyer  in 1960.

In 1950, Synnot had taken part in the Bridgeford Mission to Malaya, which advised the Australian government on the Malayan Emergency. His report on the options for providing naval support for the British laid the foundations for Australian naval involvement in the region and led to Synnot's secondment to command the Royal Malaysian Navy from 1962 to 1965.

On his return to Australia, Synnot attended administrative staff college before returning to sea in 1966 as Captain of the Australian aircraft carrier HMAS Sydney, then in 1967, the carrier HMAS Melbourne. He was the only officer to command both aircraft carriers.

After a year at the Imperial Defence College in London, he returned to Australia as director general of fighting equipment. Promoted to rear-admiral in 1970, he became chief of naval personnel and subsequently deputy chief of naval staff. He became Flag Officer Commanding HM Australian Fleet in 1973. In 1974, he was appointed director joint staff in the Australian Defence Department, and played a leading role in the relief effort following the devastation of Darwin by Cyclone Tracy.

In 1976, Synnot was promoted to vice admiral and appointed Chief of Naval Staff. He initiated a review of the Navy Office and of the Navy's structure of command and control. He drew up a blueprint for the maintenance of naval capability into the future, and oversaw the Navy's guided-missile frigate project.

Extremely able and practical, Synnot came to be regarded as one of the country's most outstanding defence force chiefs. A strong believer in deterrence and an advocate of close co-operation with America and countries in the Pacific region, Synnot emphasised the need for a strong military capability for national defence and for joint operations with Australia's allies overseas. He was said to have done more to equip Australia's armed forces with up-to-date military technology than any of his predecessors. In particular, he was instrumental in persuading the Australian government of the need to upgrade the country's air force with the acquisition of the F/A-18 Hornet.

He was also behind the decision to acquire the British aircraft carrier  as a replacement for the ageing HMAS Melbourne. However, Britain withdrew the offer to sell Invincible after the Falklands War.

Synnot retired on 20 April 1982.

Personal
Synnot was appointed a Commander of the Order of the British Empire in 1971, and knighted as a Knight Commander of the Order of the British Empire in 1978. He was appointed an Officer of the Order of Australia in 1976. He married Virginia Davenport in 1959 and they remained married until her death in 1965. He married a second time in 1968 to Anne Colvin (née Manifold), great-niece of former Prime Minister of Australia Stanley Bruce and mother of journalist Mark Colvin.

Admiral Sir Anthony Synnot died on 4 July 2001 at the age of 79, after suffering from a long illness.

References

External links
 Australian Naval Personalities: Synnot, Anthony Monckton (1922–2001)
 Defence Force – Previous Chiefs
 Media release – Death of Admiral Sir Anthony Synnot

1922 births
2001 deaths
Military personnel from New South Wales
Graduates of the Royal College of Defence Studies
Australian Knights Commander of the Order of the British Empire
Australian military personnel of the Malayan Emergency
Australian military personnel of the Vietnam War
Chiefs of Defence Force Staff (Australia)
Deputy Chiefs of Naval Staff (Australia)
Officers of the Order of Australia
People educated at Geelong Grammar School
People from New South Wales
Royal Australian Navy admirals
Royal Australian Navy personnel of World War II